Dame Diana Buchanan Crossan  (born 1949) is a New Zealand public servant. She worked at the State Services Commission, where she was the first manager of the Equal Employment Opportunities Unit. She served as Retirement Commissioner between 2003 and 2013, and contributed to the development of the KiwiSaver scheme. From 2013 to 2017, she was chief executive of Wellington Free Ambulance. In the 2019 New Year Honours, Crossan was appointed a Dame Companion of the New Zealand Order of Merit, for services to the State.

Crossan grew up in small towns in the South Island of New Zealand where her father was a teacher and Headmaster. She has three sisters: Helen Sinclair Crossan, Dunedin born 1947; Isobel Ann Simmers, Gujan Mestra, France born 1951 and Margaret Constance Palmer, Napier born 1953. She attended high school in Pleasant Point New Zealand and in Roxboro, North Carolina, USA. She attended Otago University, Dunedin New Zealand and Swansea College University of Wales. Crossan lives in Wellington with her partner Neale Morgan Pitches born 1947.

References

1949 births
Living people
New Zealand public servants
Dames Companion of the New Zealand Order of Merit